Dartmouth South is a provincial electoral district in Nova Scotia, Canada, that elects one member of the Nova Scotia House of Assembly. The riding is currently represented by Claudia Chender of the NDP.
The district was created in 1966, under the name Dartmouth City South, when Halifax County Dartmouth was divided into two electoral districts. In 1967, the district was renamed Dartmouth South. In 2003, the district was renamed Dartmouth South – Portland Valley. In 2013 following the Nova Scotia Electoral Boundaries Commission review, the district returned to its earlier name of Dartmouth South and lost the area south of Russell Lake and east of Highway 111 to Cole Harbour-Eastern Passage.

Geography

Members of the Legislative Assembly
This riding has elected the following Members of the Legislative Assembly:

Election results

1967 general election

1970 general election

1974 general election

1978 general election

1981 general election

1984 general election

1988 general election

1993 general election

1998 general election

1999 general election

2003 general election

2006 general election

2009 general election

2013 general election 

|-

|align="right"| 4,049
|align="right"| 46.24
|align="right"| +18.34
|-
 
|New Democratic Party
|Mary Vingoe
|align="right"| 2,918
|align="right"| 33.32
|align="right"| -22.24

|-
 
|Progressive Conservative
|Gord Gamble
|align="right"| 1,612
|align="right"| 18.41
|align="right"| +5.16
|-

|align="right"| 178
|align="right"| 2.03
|align="right"|  

|}

2015 by-election

2017 general election

2021 general election

References

External links
2006 riding profile
2003 riding profile
 June 13, 2006 Nova Scotia Provincial General Election Poll By Poll Results

Nova Scotia provincial electoral districts
Dartmouth, Nova Scotia
Politics of Halifax, Nova Scotia